FIBA's 50 Greatest Players (1991) is the list of the 50 greatest players in the history of FIBA international basketball, as selected in the year 1991, by FIBA Magazine. The list was created in honor of the 100th anniversary of the creation of the sport of basketball, by James Naismith. FIBA had a group of international basketball experts, composed mainly of international basketball coaches, vote for the 50 greatest players list. Each expert voter was tasked with picking 25 players. The voting was tallied as, 25 points for a 1st place vote, 24 points for a 2nd place vote, and so on. There were 51 players selected, as a result of a tie in the vote totals. Players from all over the world were considered to be eligible for the voting, including NBA players. 

Five European players that had played in the NBA up to that time made the list (Divac, Petrović, Marčiulionis, Volkov, Martín). However, no U.S.A. NBA players made the list, because they were not competing in major FIBA-organized tournaments until the 1992 Summer Olympics. Nonetheless, 5 players with U.S.A. citizenship that played in leagues other than the NBA, did make the list (Brabender, Luyk, Galis, Cruz, Morse).

FIBA's 50 Greatest All-Time Players (1991)

Player nationalities were selected by the national team eligibility of each player:

FIBA's 50 Greatest All-Time Players (1991) Top 10 Vote Results

See also
FIBA Order of Merit
FIBA Hall of Fame
 List of members of the FIBA Hall of Fame
50 Greatest EuroLeague Contributors
50 Greatest Players in NBA History

Sources

References

European basketball awards
Players